Peter Feldman is an American poker player.

Peter Feldman(n) may also refer to:

Peter Feldman (attorney) (born 1982), American lawyer
Peter Maximovich Feldman (1899–1938), Soviet military and naval leader
Peter Feldmann (born 1958), mayor of Frankfurt, Germany

See also
Hans-Peter Feldmann (born 1941), German visual artist